Matías Hernán Moya (born 26 March 1998) is an Argentine professional footballer who plays as a midfielder for Chilean Primera División side Colo-Colo.

Club career
Moya joined River Plate in 2010, he was promoted into the club's first-team squad in 2016. His professional debut arrived on 4 December against Independiente, playing sixty-five minutes of a 1–0 defeat. He scored his first career goal on 2 December 2018 against Gimnasia y Esgrima. January 2019 saw Moya leave on loan to Banfield. He remained for two seasons, making ten appearances in all competitions - though he started just twice. Upon returning to River in 2020, Moya was offered a contract extension through to 2022.

On 2021 season he was loaned to Chilean Primera División side Ñublense. He continued at Ñublense for the 2022 season.

International career
Moya is eligible to play for Argentina or Chile internationally, the latter due to him having Chilean heritage through his grandparents. He rejected the chance to play for Chile at U20 level in February 2017.

Career statistics
.

References

External links

1998 births
Living people
People from Neuquén
Argentine sportspeople of Chilean descent
Citizens of Chile through descent
Naturalized citizens of Chile
Argentine footballers
Argentine expatriate footballers
Association football midfielders
Association football wingers
Argentine Primera División players
Chilean Primera División players
Club Atlético River Plate footballers
Club Atlético Banfield footballers
Ñublense footballers
Colo-Colo footballers
Argentine expatriate sportspeople in Chile
Expatriate footballers in Chile